Kathiramangalam  is a village in the  
Thiruvidaimarudur revenue block of Thanjavur district,
 Tamil Nadu, India.

Demographics 

As per the 2017 electoral data, Kathiramangalam had a total population of  788 with 400 males and 388 females. Out of the total population 
373 people were literate.

References

Villages in Thanjavur district